The Dead Boats Disposal Society (DBDS) is a non-profit society dedicated to the removal and disposal of abandoned boats and marine debris from shorelines in British Columbia, Canada.  The Victoria-based Society has hauled 124 boats out of the water since 2017, most from bays and inlets in the Capital Regional District from Sooke to the Gulf Islands.  By February 2020, the group had removed 89,300 metric tonnes of marine debris.

Issue 
The problem of derelict boats is widespread along the British Columbia coast since, before July 2019 when the Wrecked, Abandoned or Hazardous Vessels Act came into effect, it was not illegal to abandon a boat along Canada's coastline.  With the Act, the government of Canada gained enforcement powers to impose penalties on individuals of up to $50,000, and to remove problem vessels if they are a hazard to safety or a threat to the marine environment.  However, the Saanich Inlet Protection Society says "It seems the only time they act is after the boats have sunk."  A boat may be an environmental and navigation hazard for years before it sinks, and John Roe of the DBDS notes that delaying action increases the cost of removal.  While local municipalities are left to deal with derelict boats that come ashore, the problem is complicated from a jurisdictional standpoint because the seabed is a provincial responsibility, activities on the surface are under the purview of the Coast Guard, and the water in between is subject to Fisheries and Oceans Canada authority.

Process 
Typically, when the Society is notified by the public about a problem boat, it conducts a survey to determine if the vessel is truly abandoned.  Once a boat is removed with a barge and crane, it is tested for contaminants, dismantled, and disposed of at appropriate landfills.  The cost to remove and dispose of a small craft ranges from $5,000 to $75,000.  Transport Canada estimates there are close to 1,600 abandoned and derelict boats in the waters of British Columbia.

Funding 
The DBDS has received grants and resources from "a long list of partners" including the Capital Regional District, and Transport Canada's short-term Abandoned Boats Program.

Recognition 
The Dead Boats Disposal Society's operations director and founder, John Roe, has been cleaning up derelict boats from British Columbia waters for more than 25 years.  Roe received an award from Saanich Mayor Fred Haynes on February 25, 2019 for the DBDS's work removing problem boats from Cadboro Bay and the Gorge Waterway.

References

External links 
 Abandoned Dreams documentary features work being done by the Dead Boats Disposal Society
 Dead Boats Disposal Society Facebook page
 Transport Canada's Abandoned Boats Program projects
 Department of Fisheries and Oceans' Small Craft Harbours Abandoned and Wrecked Vessels Removal Program
 The Veins of Life Watershed Society, Victoria Harbour History

Marine conservation organizations
Environmental organizations based in British Columbia